Bronzewing may refer to:

Birds
 Bronzewing pigeon, a group of pigeons native to Australia
 Brush bronzewing, species of bird in the pigeon family
 Common bronzewing, species of bird in the pigeon family
 Crested bronzewing, species of bird in the pigeon family
 Flock bronzewing, species of bird in the pigeon family
 New Britain bronzewing, species of bird in the pigeon family
 New Guinea bronzewing, species of bird in the pigeon family

Places
 Bronzewing Gold Mine, a gold mine in Western Australia

Animal common name disambiguation pages